The eastern clapper lark (Mirafra fasciolata) is a small passerine bird which breeds in southern Africa. It derives its name from the wing clapping which forms part of its display flight.

Taxonomy and systematics
The Eastern clapper lark was originally placed in the genus Alauda. This species and the Cape clapper lark were formerly considered conspecific as the clapper lark (M. apiata) until split in 2009. The Eastern clapper lark and the Cape clapper lark are regarded as forming a superspecies with the flappet lark, which is found further to the north. Damara clapper lark is an alternate name for the Cape clapper lark.

Subspecies
Five subspecies are recognized: 
 M. f. reynoldsi - Benson & Irwin, 1965: Found in northern Namibia, northern Botswana and south-western Zambia
 M. f. jappi - Traylor, 1962: Found in western Namibia
 M. f. nata - Smithers, 1955: Found in north-eastern Botswana 
 M. f. damarensis - Sharpe, 1875: Found in northern and central Namibia, western and central Botswana
 M. f. fasciolata - (Sundevall, 1850): Found in south-central Botswana, northern and central South Africa

Description
This lark is a 15-cm-long bird, with a brown crown, rich rufous underparts, and a strong bill. It has brown upperparts (greyer in the north of its range). Its call is an ascending "pooooeeeee".

Distribution and habitat
The eastern clapper lark is found in much of the drier parts of southern Africa in Zambia, Namibia, Botswana, Lesotho and South Africa. It is a species of open grassland and savannah.

Behaviour and ecology

The eastern clapper lark is a skulking species, difficult to find when not displaying. It is not gregarious, and individuals tend to be seen in dry habitats feeding on the ground on seeds and insects. The display commences with an ascending flight with wing flapping. It then parachutes down with trailing legs.

References

Sinclair, Hockey and Tarboton, SASOL Birds of Southern Africa, 

eastern clapper lark
Birds of Southern Africa
eastern clapper lark